Point Lengua de Vaca is a northward headland on the coast of the Coquimbo Region south of the city of Coquimbo in Chile. To the east of Point Lengua de Vaca lies Tongoy Bay.

Notes

References
Merriam-Webster's Geographical Dictionary, Third Edition. Springfield, Massachusetts: Merriam-Webster, Incorporated, 1997. .

Landforms of Coquimbo Region
Headlands of Chile
Coasts of Coquimbo Region